Konrad Tallroth (November 12, 1872 – January 27, 1926) was a Finnish actor, screenwriter, and director.
He was a pioneering filmmaker in Finland.

In 1916 Tallroth worked six months for Svenska Biografteatern (later AB Svensk Filmindustri) in Lidingö, Sweden, where he directed eight films. Copies of two of these films survive.

Filmography

 Rakkauden Kaikkivalta- Amor Omnia (1922)
 The Rafter's Bride (1923)
 Kesä (1915)
 Suursalon häät (1924)
 Miljonarvet (1917)
The Village Shoemakers (1923) 
Skuggan av ett brott (1917)
Chanson triste (1917)
Vem sköt? (1917)
Kun onni pettää (1913)

Notes

1872 births
1926 deaths
People from Seinäjoki
People from Vaasa Province (Grand Duchy of Finland)
Swedish-speaking Finns
Finnish male film actors
Finnish male silent film actors
20th-century Finnish male actors
Finnish film directors